The United States ambassador to Bahrain is the official representative of the president of the United States to the head of state of Bahrain. The current Ambassador to Bahrain is Steven C. Bondy who has been serving since February 9, 2022.

Until 1971, Bahrain had been part of a British protectorate along with the other sheikhdoms in the Persian Gulf. In 1971 the protectorate ended and seven of the other sheikhdoms joined in a federation to become the United Arab Emirates. Bahrain, however, did not join the federation but declared its independence on August 15, 1971. The United States recognized the State of Bahrain on the same day and moved to establish diplomatic relations. 

The U.S. Embassy in Manama was opened on September 21, 1971, with John N. Gatch, Jr. as Chargé d'Affaires ad interim. Ambassador William A. Stoltzfus, Jr. presented his credentials to the government of Bahrain on February 17, 1972. Stoltzfus was concurrently the ambassador to Kuwait, Qatar, Oman, and the United Arab Emirates, while resident in Kuwait. The first ambassador commissioned solely to Bahrain was Joseph W. Twinam in 1974.

Ambassadors and chiefs of mission

Notes

See also
 Bahrain–United States relations
 Embassy of the United States, Manama
 Ambassadors of Bahrain to the United States
 Embassy of Bahrain, Washington, D.C.

References
United States Department of State: Background notes on Bahrain
Chiefs of Mission for Bahrain

External links
 United States Department of State: Chiefs of Mission for Bahrain
 United States Department of State: Bahrain
 United States Embassy in Manama
 

Bahrain
 
United States